II is the second studio album by Canadian hardcore punk band Cursed. It was released on January 25, 2005 through Goodfellows Records. It was critically praised by most reviewers.

Track listing

Personnel

Band
Chris Colohan - Vocals, Composer, Group Member, Layout Design 
Christian McMaster - Guitar
T. Piriano - Bass
Radwan Moumneh - Guitar
Mike Maxymuik - Drums, Piano

Production
João Carvalho - Mastering
Rudy Rempel - Audio Engineer, Engineer
Ian Blurton - Audio Production, Mixing
Audio production and production by Cursed

References

External links
AllMusic review

2005 albums
Cursed (band) albums
Deathwish Inc. albums